Kalateh-ye Feshay (also Romanized as Kalāteh-ye Feshāy; also known as Seyyedābād) is a village in Sarvelayat Rural District, Sarvelayat District, Nishapur County, Razavi Khorasan Province, Iran. At the 2006 census, its population was 66, in 17 families.

References 

Populated places in Nishapur County